Wilhelm Wagner (born 3 October 1941) is a German middle-distance runner. He competed in the 3000 metres steeplechase at the 1968 Summer Olympics and the 1972 Summer Olympics.

References

1941 births
Living people
Athletes (track and field) at the 1968 Summer Olympics
Athletes (track and field) at the 1972 Summer Olympics
German male middle-distance runners
German male steeplechase runners
Olympic athletes of West Germany
Place of birth missing (living people)
20th-century German people